I en annan del av Köping (Elsewhere in Köping) is a Swedish documentary television series which began broadcasting in 2007 on TV4. The series depicts the daily lives of people with learning disabilities in Köping, Sweden, and has been described as one of Sweden's most popular programs.

The people documented in the series are Linda Hammar, Torbjörn Jonsson (Tobbe), Mikael Wiseby (Micke) and Mats Halvarsson. Linda Hammar is the sister of Filip Hammar, the show's creator.

Episodes

Season 1
7 January 2007
14 January 2007
21 January 2007
28 January 2007
4 February 2007
11 February 2007

Season 2
1 February 2008
4 February 2008
11 February 2008
17 February 2008
24 February 2008
2 March 2008

Season 3
10 January 2010: "Tipspromenad"
17 January 2010: "Linda och Tobbe går på tivoli"
24 January 2010: "Bowlingturnering"
31 January 2010: "Linda fixar midsommarfirande"
7 February 2010
14 February 2010

Season 4
20 February 2017

Awards and nominations
2007: Kristallen - Årets dokumentär - Winner
2007: Kristallen - Årets program - Winner
2008: Kristallen - Årets dokumentär - Nominated

References

External links
I en annan del av Köping at tv4.se
I en annan del av Köping at the website of Köping Municipality

TV4 (Sweden) original programming
2000s Swedish television series